Allahabad-e Do (also Romanized as Allahābād-e Do; also known as Allahābād) is a village in Chahdegal Rural District, Negin Kavir District, Fahraj County, Kerman Province, Iran. At the 2006 census, its population was 157, in 30 families.

References 

Populated places in Fahraj County